Sursand is an Indian town in the Mithila region of Bihar near the Indo-Nepal border. It is about 25 kilometres away from Sitamarhi, the district headquarters, and approximately five kilometers away from Bhitthamore.

History
The village has the ruins of a fortress known as Sursandgarh, which was constructed during the Mughal period by King Sursen.

According to an account published in the Bengal District Gazetteers,
The name of the place is said to be derived from Sur Sen, a chieftain who once lived there. After his death, it lapsed once more into jungle, until it was reclaimed by two brothers—Mahesh Jha and Amar Jha, the founders of the present Sursand family. These brothers, the story runs, left their home at Ghograha, in the district of Darbhanga, and came to settle at Jadupati, a village belonging to them, 8 miles from Sursand. One day Mahesh Jha went with his astrologer to hunt in the woods at Sursand, and came across the ruins of Sur Sen's fort.  The astrologer having told him that the man who made a home there would be a Raja, Mahesh Jha acted on his advice and cleared the jungle. The several branches of the Sursand family sprang from his son, Chaudhri Kelwal Krishna. Amar Jha's branch did not prosper, and his descendants are impoverished. Chaudhri Hirdai Narayan, a descendant of the elder branch, added largely to the family estates.King Sursena always admired Babu Bhim Lal Singh II of Singh Dynasty because his Daughter Maheshwari Devi was married to Babu Bhim Lal Singh II of Singh Dynasty.

During the 1857 Indian mutiny, the zamindars of Sursand assisted the British to suppress the movement. They offered a reward of 30 rupees for each deserter seized.

Archaeological geography
In the outskirts of the modern town, the area locally known as Garh Devi Sthan has a three-metre high circular mound covering about two acres of ground.

Notable people 
Shyam Nandan Prasad Mishra served as the Union Deputy Minister for Planning from 1954 to 1962.

Schools and College 
Jawahar Lal Neharu Memorial College, Nawahi, Sitamarhi

References

External links
About Sursand
Satellite map of Sursand
Bengal district gazetteers 1901

Cities and towns in Sitamarhi district
Transit and customs posts along the India–Nepal border